R. D. Shekar is an Indian politician and is Member of the Legislative Assembly of Tamil Nadu. He was elected to the Tamil Nadu legislative assembly as a Dravida Munnetra Kazhagam candidate from Perambur constituency in the by-election in 2019.

Shekar is in public life for over 30 years. He has been working for the welfare of general voters under the guidance of the top leadership of Dravida Munnetra Kazagam (DMK), one of the most popular political parties in the Indian state of Tamil Nadu.

R. D. Shekar was elected as the Member of  Legislative Assembly of Tamil Nadu in bypoll held at Perambur Assembly Constituency in April 2019 following the disqualification of the legislator who was elected in 2016. The by-poll held in April 2019 provided great opportunity for R.D. Sekar B.Com, BL to rise his political career to the next level. He successfully contested the by-poll under the guidance and the leadership of Mr. M.K. Stalin, the DMK chief, who is popularly referred by his followers and public as Thalapathy.

For R.D. Sekar, B.Com, BL, representing the DMK and the Perambur Assembly Constituency is a dream, and the bypoll provided opportunity for him to realize the dream.

Prior to becoming a MLA, R.D. Sekar, B.Com, BL was appointed as the Deputy Secretary of the Youth Wing of DMK in 2015. He continues to hold this position till today, and reports to Mr. Udayanidhi Stalin, the Secretary of the DMK Youth Wing, and also the son of the DMK chief, Mr. M.K. Stalin, Thalapathy.

R.D. Sekar, B.Com, BL was tasked with the role of District In-Charge, North Chennai, DMK for the period starting from 11 July 2011 to 30 December 2014. The role of the District Secretary or District In-Charge is the most respected and responsible position at the District Level within the DMK party hierarchy who directly reports to the top leadership of the party.

Earlier in 2008, the party leadership appointed R.D. Sekar, B.Com, BL as the Paguthi Seyalalar, looking after few wards, and reporting to the party leadership at the district level.

From 2006 to 2011, R. D. Sekar, B.Com, BL represented Ward 2 at the Greater Chennai Corporation as the Elected Member.

In 1998, R. D. Sekar, B.Com, BL was appointed as the Amaipu Seyalalar, North Chennai District, DMK Youth Wing. Earlier, in 1991, R.D. Sekar, B.Com, BL was appointed as the Amaipalar, Students Wing of the North Chennai DMK. The first position of R.D Sekar in the party was as the Amaipalar, Students Wing, Egmore Paguthi. He served at this position in the year 1988.

Electoral performance

References 

Living people
Dravida Munnetra Kazhagam politicians
People from Chennai
Year of birth missing (living people)
Tamil Nadu MLAs 2021–2026